The hummel (also hommel or humle) is an old Northern European stringed instrument similar to an older type of zither and is related to the Norwegian langeleik. The name is thought to come from the German word hummel, meaning "bumblebee", referring to the droning sound created by the accompaniment strings.

History
The hummel is probably from the Middle Ages, when it was found all over Europe in slightly differing variants. The instrument was common in the Netherlands, Flanders, Northern Germany and Denmark during the 18th century. The earliest evidence of the instrument in Swedish folk culture is from the 17th century, and it seems to have been most common in the southern parts of the country. During the 19th century, the hummel was considered to be a primitive peasant instrument and its popularity dwindled. In Flanders, these instruments appeared during the 17th century and were popular with soldiers in the trenches during World War I, climaxing in the 1920s and 1930s but by the 1930s they returned to obscurity. They were mainly a family instruments and were widely played by women. Some enthusiasts have taken up playing it again since the folk revival of the 1970s.

Construction
The hummel is an instrument that exists in many forms, with regards to appearance, as well as number of strings etc. Common to all varieties is a flat top and bottom. There are variations in the material used, but it is always thin. On the top are one or more soundholes which can come in many forms. The strings vary in number but often include a smaller number of melody strings and a greater number of accompanying strings. It is not uncommon to have three melody strings: two tuned identically, and the third tuned one octave below the others. Under the melody strings, either directly on the body or attached to a fretboard, are about 17 frets. The body comes in two main forms, either a pear-shaped form with the strings in the middle, or a half-pear with the strings near the edge.

Playing
The hummel is placed on a table like a zither, to amplify the sound. The melody strings are sounded by being plucked downwards, either with fingers or a plectrum. The identically tuned melody strings are often fretted in unison or so to create a major third. It is even possible to play a sixth interval, through using the octave string. The strings are played with a plectrum and are often all played at once. This is common because the accompaniment strings are tuned to a suitable chord that is relatively open, for example all the strings may be tuned to D or A.

Music
The hummel is perfectly suited for accompanying tunes, thanks to the many accompaniment strings. However, because of the relatively limited range of the instrument for playing more intricate melodies and keys, it is unlikely there are many compositions written specifically for this instrument.

Players
The most famous hummel player is probably Otto Malmborg or Ottar Hyll as his artist name was. An example of a contemporary hummel player is Erik Hector, who played the hummel on many of Sågskära's productions and Henrik "Hummel" Schön.

See also
Appalachian dulcimer
Epinette des Vosges
Langeleik
Langspil
Scheitholt

References

Fretted zithers
Swedish musical instruments
Dutch musical instruments
Danish musical instruments
Belgian musical instruments
German musical instruments
Norwegian musical instruments
Icelandic musical instruments
Finnish musical instruments
Estonian musical instruments